The Blood on Satan's Claw (or Blood on Satan's Claw)  is a 1971 British supernatural horror film directed by Piers Haggard and starring Patrick Wymark, Linda Hayden, and Barry Andrews. Set in early 18th-century England, it follows the residents of a rural village whose youth fall under the influence of a demonic presence after a local farmer unearths a mysterious deformed skull buried in a field.

The screenplay for the film was originally written by Robert Wynne-Simmons as an anthology of horror stories set in a small village, and had the working title of Satan's Skin. After director Haggard was hired for the project, he and Wynne-Simmons reworked the screenplay into a singular cohesive narrative. Principal photography took place in 1970, mainly in the Chiltern Hills region of England.

The Blood on Satan's Claw premiered in New York City in April 1971, and was subsequently released in London on 16 July 1971. It was met with middling reviews from critics, and underperformed at the box office. In the intervening years, however, the film has gained a cult following, and has been cited by several film scholars as a progenitor of the folk horror genre, along with its contemporaries Witchfinder General (1968) and The Wicker Man (1973).

Plot
In a rural village in early 18th-century England, farmer Ralph Gower uncovers a deformed skull with one intact eye and strange fur. He insists that the local judge looks at it, but it mysteriously vanishes. The judge disregards the incident, crediting it to Ralph's superstitious fears. Meanwhile, Peter Edmonton brings his fiancee, Rosalind Barton, to meet his aunt, Mistress Banham, with whom the judge is staying. Mistress Banham and the judge disapprove of the match and arrange for Rosalind to sleep in a disused attic room. Rosalind begins screaming during the night and injures Banham when she investigates, causing her to fall mysteriously ill.

Despite Peter’s protests, the judge arranges to have Rosalind committed; as she is led out, Peter glimpses a monstrous claw in place of her hand. Meanwhile, three children find a claw, from the deformed body from which the skull presumably came, while playing next to a field. That evening, Mistress Banham disappears. Convinced that the house contains evil, Peter sneaks into the attic room at night and is attacked by a creature with a furred claw. He tries to hack it with a knife but, when the judge bursts in, he finds that Peter has severed his own hand. Though sceptical of supernatural involvement, the judge borrows a book on witchcraft. The next day, the judge departs for London, leaving the pompous and slow-witted Squire Middleton in charge, but promises to return.

Mark, one of the three children, is lured out by his classmates, who are playing truant from their scripture classes so they can play ritualistic games in a ruined church under their ringleader, Angel Blake. Mark is tricked into playing a lethal game of blind man's buff and his body is hidden in his family's woodshed. Angel Blake attempts to seduce the curate, Reverend Fallowfield. When he resists, she tells him that Mark is dead and 'had the devil in him, so we cut it out'. At Mark's funeral, Angel's father speaks to the squire, accusing the curate of attempting to molest his daughter and of potentially killing Mark.

Mark's sister, Cathy, is gathering flowers for his grave when two boys attack and bind her under the pretence of a game. Ralph, who has been courting her, hears her scream but cannot find her. The boys lead Cathy to Angel, who marches her in a procession with the other children to the ruined church, where they perform a Black Mass to the demon Behemoth, who appears as a furred beast. The children tear Cathy’s dress to reveal fur on her back. All the children have been growing these patches of fur, which have been flayed from their bodies to restore the demon’s physical form. The cult ritualistically rape and murder Cathy, and flay the fur from her back. Ralph finds her body in the church and carries her to the Squire, who releases Fallowfield but is unable to arrest Angel, who has vanished.

Ralph finds men attempting to drown a girl named Margaret, whom they suspect of witchcraft. He rescues her and finds fur on her leg. He convinces a doctor to remove it, but when Margaret wakes she proves to be a committed servant of the devil and flees. The judge returns and sets dogs to track her. Margaret seeks out Angel, but Angel abandons her when she realises she no longer bears a piece of the demon’s skin.

Margaret is caught and, interrogated by the judge, reveals that the cult will meet at the ruined church to complete the ritual to rebuild the demon’s body. The judge assembles a mob to destroy the cult and demon. Ralph, whose leg has sprouted fur, awakens in the church surrounded by the cult. He nearly flays the fur from his legs in a trance before the mob attack. In the ensuing violence, Angel is killed and the judge kills the demon with a sword, ending the curse on Ralph and returning him to normal.

Cast 

Actress Roberta Tovey has an uncredited role as the coven member who lures Padbury's character to her death.

Production

Development
The film was originally envisioned by screenwriter Robert Wynne-Simmons as an anthology of three loosely connected but separate stories set in a Victorian era village, at the request of Tigon British Film Productions. The disparate stories included one involving a woman locked in an attic by her abusive aunt; a group of children who uncover a monstrous carcass in a field; and a man who cuts off his own hand, which is possessed by a demon. Each of the stories were connected by an overarching narrative of the pastoral village being infiltrated by various evil forces. Wynne-Simmons's screenplay was inspired in part by the Manson Family and the Mary Bell child murders. He later elaborated:

Tigon executives ultimately opted to have Wynne-Simmons transpose the story to an early-eighteenth-century farming community, having felt that the Victorian Era had been exhausted by various genre films. Wynne-Simmons stated that he was specifically asked by the producers to include a number of elements from the studio's previous film, Witchfinder General, such as the "Book of Witches" as well as the sequence in which Margaret is ducked in a body of water by locals who suspect she is a witch. "This had to be included because it had been so successful in Witchfinder General, so they wanted to repeat it," he recalled. "I didn't mind that so much, as it did show the incredible stupidity of people at the time." Additionally, several other changes were mandated by Tigon, including a redraft of the ending, which originally had the Judge enlisting a militia to murder the entire village to eradicate the cult. Tigon executives deemed this ending too bleak, and it was replaced with a finale in which the demon is defeated, and the villagers are spared.

Director Piers Haggard was hired to direct the project, and worked with Wynne-Simmons to retool the screenplay from its anthology format to a singular, cohesive narrative. Summarizing the screenplay, Haggard commented in 2003:

By Haggard's account, the film's original working title was The Devil’s Touch, which was subsequently changed to Satan's Skin.

Casting
Haggard says Linda Hayden had to be used as she was under contract to Tony Tenser. Tamara Ustinov, the daughter of actor Peter Ustinov, was cast in part because of her name. The role of the judge was originally offered to Peter Cushing, who declined it due to his wife's illness; Christopher Lee was considered, but his fee was too high for the budget so Patrick Wymark was cast instead. The film was Wymark's last English language film and was released three months after his death.

With the younger cast, Haggard dedicated two weeks prior to the shoot to hold rehearsals.

Filming

Filming began on 14 April 1970 on an initial budget of £75,000, which expanded to £82,000. The shoot lasted approximately eight weeks, and mainly took place in the small village of Bix Bottom, Oxfordshire, located in the Chiltern Hills. The ruined church that figures prominently is the old Saint James Church in Bix Bottom, which had been abandoned in 1875. Prior to its appearance in The Blood on Satan's Claw, the church had been used as a location in The Witches (1966).

The scene in which the villagers hold a funeral for Mark Vespers was shot in the village of Hurley, while portions of the woodland sequences were filmed in the Warburg Nature Reserve and Black Park near Iver Heath, Buckinghamshire. Additionally, some filming took place at Pinewood Film Studios.

Several of the younger cast members, particularly Hayden, Ustinov, and Richard Williams, recalled that Haggard's direction was concise and that the shoot operated smoothly.

The film was shot by cinematographer Dick Bush. When devising the film's visual elements, Haggard was influenced by the works of Ingmar Bergman, particularly The Seventh Seal (1957) and The Virgin Spring (1960). Haggard adopted a "painterly" style for the film, marked by low camera angles that cast the actors on high landscapes against open skies.

Anthony Ainley, who plays a curate who Linda Hayden's character attempted to seduce, once said in an interview, "When it came to doing the nude scene where Angel comes into the rectory at night and disrobes this was done at least three times and Linda was spot on with every take...she was a total professional with a refined sense of the erotic unusual for her age...I believe she was only 17 at the time."

Musical score 
The film's score was composed by Marc Wilkinson, an Australian composer who had previously worked alongside Haggard at the National Theatre. "[He] had a wonderful command of strange sounds," said the director. "He wasn't somebody who would ever give you a stock sound. And I think he absolutely excelled himself. It's certainly one of the best scores I've ever had for a film."

Release

Distribution and box office
The Blood on Satan's Claw was acquired by the American distribution company, Cannon Films, who released it theatrically in the United States in the spring of 1971, with a New York City opening taking place on 15 April 1971. It went on to screen frequently in the American drive-in theater circuit throughout the remainder of 1971.

In its native England, the film was passed by the British Board of Film Classification (BBFC) with an X rating, and premiered in London on 16 July 1971. Under ten seconds of cuts were mandated by the BBFC, though some sequences were optically darkened, including the scene in which a nude Angel attempts to seduce the Curate. According to screenwriter Wynne-Simmons, a shot of Angel performing oral sex on the demon was also significantly truncated and darkened, though a brief portion of it appears in the final cut of the film. For its release in England, Tigon British Film Distributors secured the New Victoria Cinema to screen the film, which accommodated 2,600 guests. However, following low ticket sales, the film was pulled from the theatre after showing for only one week.

Critical response
Upon its theatrical release, The Blood on Satan's Claw, reviews from film critics ranged from favourable to middling. Vincent Canby of The New York Times praised the performances in the film, adding that it has "a good deal of the quality of an H. P. Lovecraft work, in the vulnerability of even its heroic characters, as well as in its pastoral landscape that contains the threat of "eeveel" within every sun-dappled glade. Most particularly, it contains Lovecraft's perfectly straightfaced acceptance of a universe whose natural order may, at any time, be overturned by supernatural disorder."

On review aggregator website Rotten Tomatoes, the film holds an approval rating of 70% based on 10 reviews, with an average rating of 6.3/10.

Home media
The Blood on Satan's Claw first received a VHS release in the United States in 1985 by Paragon Video Productions. It was re-released in this format in 1993 by MGM Home Entertainment. In 2005, it was released by Anchor Bay Entertainment in a Region 2 box set along with several other Tigon British Film Distributors films, including Witchfinder General, The Beast in the Cellar, and others.

The British label Odeon Entertainment released Blood on Satan's Claw on Blu-ray in 2013. In May 2019, the England-based Screenbound Pictures issued a DVD and limited edition Blu-ray featuring a new restoration of the film. In November 2019, Severin Films followed with another limited edition Blu-ray, along with a bonus CD of the original score, limited to 3,000 units.

Variant titles

Variant prints of the film exist with both The Blood on Satan's Claw and Blood on Satan's Claw in the opening titles, which has led to the two versions being used interchangeably on DVD and Blu-ray releases. US posters used The Blood on Satan's Claw. UK posters (and newspaper advertisements from the time) used Blood on Satan's Claw. Blood on Satan's Claw was also the version used on Trunk Records' 2007 soundtrack release, the 2018 Audible drama, and the cover of the 2022 novelisation by screenwriter Robert Wynne-Simmons.

Legacy
In the years since its release, The Blood on Satan's Claw has earned a small cult following. In his 2010 BBC documentary series A History of Horror, writer and actor Mark Gatiss referred to the film as a prime example of the subgenre of "folk horror", grouping it with 1968's Witchfinder General and 1973's The Wicker Man, each films that revolve around superstitions and folklore of Britain. Gatiss was featured in a spoken-word adaptation of the film, alongside Linda Hayden (playing a different role to the one she played in the film), released by Audible.com in 2018.

Notes

References

Sources

External links

 Blood on Satan's Claw at the British Film Institute
 
 
Blood on Satan's Claw at TCMDB
Blood on Satan's Claw at Trailers from Hell

1971 films
1971 horror films
1970s historical horror films
British historical horror films
Demons in film
Films about cults
Films directed by Piers Haggard
Films scored by Marc Wilkinson
Films shot at Pinewood Studios
Films set in the 18th century
Films set in England
Films set on farms
Folk horror films
Golan-Globus films
Religious horror films
British exploitation films
British supernatural horror films
1970s English-language films
1970s British films